My Dagestan (Дир Дагъистан) is a book written in the Avar language by Rasul Gamzatov. The book does not belong to any specific genre but is a work of poetry, prose and criticism. The book  was translated from Avaric into Russian by Vladimir Soloukhin in 1967 and to English in 1970 by Julius Katzer and Dorian Rottenberg.

References

Culture of Dagestan
Avar language